David Ferrer was the defending champion, but withdrew before the beginning of the tournament because of an ankle injury.
Carlos Berlocq won the title, defeating Fernando Verdasco in the final, 7–5, 6–1.

Seeds
The top four seeds receive a bye into the second round.

Draw

Finals

Top half

Bottom half

Qualifying

Seeds

Qualifiers

Lucky loser
  Marius Copil

Qualifying draw

First qualifier

Second qualifier

Third qualifier

Fourth qualifier

External Links
 Main draw
 Qualifying draw

Swedish Open - Singles
2013 Singles